Donatekart is an India-based social enterprise that allows individuals to donate supplies needed to a charity instead of donating money. The organization was founded in 2016 by Anil Kumar Reddy and Sandeep Sharma. Donatekart act as an online crowdsourcing platform that assists non-governmental organizations to create campaigns and collect products they require from donors instead of traditional monetary donations. Donatekart is the first of its kind in the world that enables donors and philanthropist to directly donate required products to charitable organizations online instead of money. The organization was awarded with NASSCOM Social Innovation Award 2018 by K. T. Rama Rao, Minister for Information Technology, during World Conference on Information Technology held in 2019, in Hyderabad. Donatekart is incubated by Zone Startups India, an accelerator program run by Bombay Stock Exchange, Mumbai and T-Hub, Hyderabad.

History
Donatekart was founded in 2016 by Visvesvaraya National Institute of Technology alumni, Anil Kumar Reddy and Sandeep Sharma. Reddy  initially worked with Goonj, a New Delhi-based non governmental organization, for their relief project during 2015 South Indian floods. Various donations to Goonj were made through Flipkart and Amazon where the donors delivered the required relief products directly to the Goonj collection center. Similar solution was applied by Reddy and Sharma while forming Donatekart where charitable organizations can create campaigns to procure products that are in immediate need to them. Donors may choose the organizations and their required products they want to donate. Donatekart delivers the products to the organizations bringing transparency in donations made to non-governmental organization by replacing monetary donations to in-kind donations. Donatekart is a hybrid of crowdfunding and eCommerce and is the first of its type internationally. The organization's business model was ranked second during the Azim Premji Social Enterprise Challenge held in Bangalore, in 2018.

Initiatives
During 2018 Kerala floods, Donatekart collaborated with T-Hub and Goonj and helped procure the relief materials worth Rs.20 million within a week time. This initiative by the organization received coverage by major news agency across India. By April 2019, Donatekart has worked with over 600 organization all over India and has raised over 6 crore worth of products. More than forty thousand donors have channelized donations through the platform to charities from various sectors including education, elderly, medical, animals, women empowerment, humanitarian and disaster relief. The organization plans to introduce the platform to the United States and United Kingdom and raise over 100 crores worth of donations in next three years. Donatekart was listed in 40 under 40 list of 2017 by The New Indian Express. In 2018, Anil Kumar Reddy was awarded with the VNIT Nagpur Distinguished Alumni Award  from the Union Minister of India, Nitin Gadkari, in Nagpur.

Fundings and partnerships
In May 2019, Donatekart raised 2.55 Crores in seed funding from LetsVenture and other investors. Shanti Mohan, the founder of LetsVenture joined the board of the organization as part of the round. Vijay Shekhar Sharma, the founder of Paytm, has also endorsed Donatekart in 2018. The organization has been supported by HDFC Parivartan, a Corporate social responsibility initiative of HDFC Bank. During 2018 Christmas, Donatekart partnered with HDFC Bank where donations from HDFC Bank employees fulfilled wishes of 1200 poor kids across India. The organization also initiated a matching donation drive with Yes Foundation, a CSR initiative of Yes Bank, where 7 campaigns were 100% matched by Yes Foundation whenever any donation was made to such campaigns.

Accolades

References

External links

2016 establishments in Telangana